Operation Jock Scott took place shortly after the declaration of State of Emergency in the Mau Mau Rebellion. British troops suspended African political leaders and rounded up suspected Mau Mau leaders.

References 

History of Kenya
October 1952 events in Africa
1952 in Kenya